The United Nations Educational, Scientific and Cultural Organization (UNESCO) World Heritage Sites are places of importance to cultural or natural heritage as described in the UNESCO World Heritage Convention, established in 1972. Cultural heritage consists of monuments (such as architectural works, monumental sculptures, or inscriptions), groups of buildings, and sites (including archaeological sites). Natural features (consisting of physical and biological formations), geological and physiographical formations (including habitats of threatened species of animals and plants), and natural sites which are important from the point of view of science, conservation or natural beauty, are defined as natural heritage. Romania accepted the convention on 16 May 1990, making its historical sites eligible for inclusion on the list.

, there are nine World Heritage Sites in Romania, seven of which are cultural sites and two of which are natural. The first site in Romania, the Danube Delta, was added to the list at the 15th Session of the World Heritage Committee, held in Carthage in 1990. Further sites were added in 1993 and 1999 and some of the sites were subsequently expanded. The most recent site listed was the Roșia Montană Mining Cultural Landscape, in 2021, and it was immediately placed in the list of World Heritage in Danger due to plans to resume mining. The site Ancient and Primeval Beech Forests of the Carpathians and Other Regions of Europe is shared among 18 European countries. In addition, there are 16 sites on Romania's tentative list. 


World Heritage Sites 
UNESCO lists sites under ten criteria; each entry must meet at least one of the criteria. Criteria i through vi are cultural, and vii through x are natural.

Tentative list 
In addition to sites inscribed on the World Heritage list, member states can maintain a list of tentative sites that they may consider for nomination. Nominations for the World Heritage list are only accepted if the site was previously listed on the tentative list. , Romania recorded 16 sites on its tentative list.

References 

Romanian culture
Romania geography-related lists
Romania
World Heritage Sites